Negra consentida ("Spoiled Black Girl") is a 1949 Mexican film. It was written by Luis Alcoriza.

External links
 

1949 films
1940s Spanish-language films

Mexican black-and-white films
Mexican musical films
1949 musical films
1940s Mexican films